The clothing culture of Ireland is an interesting aspect of the country. Irish clothes are generally very well-made and have a long history of significance attached to them. Aran jumpers were invented in the early 20th century, and are not a historical part of Irish culture. There is no such thing as a Clan Aran. Irish Tweed is a woven fabric incorporating mutli-coloured neps - scraps of wool said originally to have been swept from the floor under the looms at the end of the day, and incorporated into the next day's weaving. In the past, much weaving was done in the home, with the fabric being delivered to a broker. Today, a few mills exist around Ireland which re-create this tweed in the traditional manner. Donegal is the heartland of Irish tweed and Donegal tweed is better known than other Irish tweeds.

History

Little is known about Irish apparel before the twelfth century. Historians believe that the early inhabitants of Ireland dressed in wool cloth, although some argue that garments made of animal skins were more prevalent. By the thirteenth century, the Irish were bundling themselves in mantles, which are coats made of wool cloth. Most mantles were composed of small scraps of cloth sewn together, although the wealthy were able to afford mantles made from a single but very large piece of cloth.

Cloaks called brait (singular: brat), on the other hand, would signify wealth if they were made from several different colors. In fact, sumptuary portion of the Brehon Law decreed that slaves could only wear cloaks with one color, while freemen could wear four and kings wore several different colors. Beneath these brats, they wore léine, a long, saffron-yellow linen tunic that extended to the ground but was gathered and belted so that it fell to the knees (the excess material was allowed to hand down at the waist and cover the belt, as can be seen in the Dutch painting illustration). The léine was very wide at the bottom and narrow on top. Likewise, the léine's sleeves were narrow at the upper arms but widened greatly at the elbows. The sleeves were open to allow the lower arm to emerge, but hung down behind the elbow to the knee or sometimes as far as the ground in more ceremonial garb. Another garment, known as an inar, was a jacket, pleated at either beneath the breast, or at the waist, with split sleeves. Woodcarvings seem to indicate that inar were richly decorated, possibly through embroidery. In winter, a cota mor was added beneath the brat: this was a greatcoat made of thick wool, with a small standup collar and sleeves that unbuttoned below the elbow to allow the long sleeves of the léine to come through.

Less is known of the early apparel of the Irish women and children. Like men, women's clothing was mostly derived from wool. It is likely that the earliest female inhabitants of Ireland also donned léinte (singular: léine) which looked similar (if not identical) to those of their male counterparts. By the fifteenth century, women were wearing long dresses made from wool cloth, often decorated with ribbons and other accessories. These dresses were created and worn in direct imitation of those found in England, where the nobility had banned Irish clothing.

References

Books
 Mairéad Dunlevy (1989). Dress in Ireland: a history Collins Press. 
 Mairéad Dunlevy (2011). Pomp and Poverty: a history of silk in Ireland Yale University Press.

External links

 https://web.archive.org/web/20160328103204/http://www.reconstructinghistory.com/articles/irish-articles/what-is-traditional-irish-dress.html
 https://www.gaelicattire.com/index.htm

 
Clothing